José de Solano y Bote, 1st Marquess of Socorro (March 6, 1726 – March 24, 1806), was a Spanish naval officer.

Biography 
He served an extensive career in the Spanish Navy starting at the age of 16 until his death in 1806. Shortly after joining the Spanish navy in 1742, he participated in the Battle of Toulon (1744), where the Spanish fleet defeated the British fleet. As a result of his performance in that battle he was promoted to the rank of alférez de fragata. In 1754 he was promoted to the rank of capitán de fragata and sent to the Americas as a commissary named by the King with the objective of helping with the demarcation of the limits between Spain and Portugal's holdings.

During this charge Solano spent seven years traveling the Orinoco river and its tributaries as well as making several trips to Bogota in pursuit of additional funding from the Viceroy to support his efforts.

When he concluded his assignment he was promoted to the rank of Capitán de Navío in 1761. In 1762 after war broke out with England he took command of the Rayo (80) a ship of the line built in La Havana.

Solano was governor of Venezuela from  1763 to 1770 and later Governor and Captain General of Santo Domingo  (1771–79).

Anglo-Spanish War

He commanded a Spanish squadron during the Anglo-Spanish War. For his role in the Siege of Pensacola where he came to the aid of Louisiana governor Bernardo de Gálvez in March 1781, Solano was promoted to lieutenant general in 1782. He became the General Captain of the Armada in 1804.

References
 Jose Luis Santalo Rodriguez de Viguri (1973). Don Jose Solano y Bote, Primer Marques del Socorro Capitan General de la Armada. Instituto Historico de Marina, Madrid. I.S.B.N. 84-00-03891-6

1726 births
1806 deaths
People from the Province of Cáceres
Captain generals of the Navy
Spanish admirals
Spanish military personnel of the American Revolutionary War